St. David's School is a private school located on Woodcote Valley Road, Purley, London, serving pupils age 3–11 years. The headteacher is Miss C Mardell. There is one form per year group with three houses: Cygnus, Aquilla and Leo. The school emblem is the Welsh Dragon.

External links
St. David's School homepage

Private co-educational schools in London
Private schools in the London Borough of Croydon